This is a list of European (Spanish and British) colonial administrators responsible for the territory of Spanish Guinea, an area equivalent to modern-day Equatorial Guinea.

List

(Dates in italics indicate de facto continuation of office)

For continuation after independence, see: List of presidents of Equatorial Guinea

See also
 Politics of Equatorial Guinea
 List of presidents of Equatorial Guinea
 Vice President of Equatorial Guinea
 List of prime ministers of Equatorial Guinea

References

External links
 World Statesmen – Equatorial Guinea

History of Equatorial Guinea
Guinea
Spanish Africa
Equatorial Guinea history-related lists